= Wellesley Heights, Lexington =

Neighborhood in Lexington, Kentucky

Coordinates: 38.038°N 84.579°W

Wellesley Heights is a neighborhood in southwestern Lexington, Kentucky, United States. It is one of only three rural subdivisions in Fayette County - to protect farmland from development they are now illegal to build. Wellesley Heights is located on the southside of Versailles Road between New Circle Road and Man O War Boulevard. It is surrounded by farmland.

Neighborhood statistics

- Area: 0.137 square miles (0.35 km^{2})
- Population: 38
- Population density: 280 people per square mile
- Median household income: $105,827
